Cypraea pantherina, common name the panther cowry, is a species of large tropical sea snail, a cowry, a marine gastropod mollusk in the family Cypraeidae, the cowries.

The panther cowry is one of only two species currently included in the genus Cypraea (the second species is  Cypraea tigris, Linnaeus, 1758), as all other species previously belonging to the genus Cypraea have been reassigned to other genera within the family Cypraeidae.

Shells of Cypraea pantherina have been found in tombs in the Rhine valley dated to 6 BCE.  Furthermore, shells of this species and the related Cypraea tigris have been unearthed at Pompeii, the ancient Roman city near Naples, Italy, where these shells may have been used as an ornament.

Description
This quite common species looks very similar to Cypraea tigris, but its shell is more slender and lighter. The shape of these shells is roughly elongate-pyriform. They are quite heavy for their size. The dorsum surface is smooth and shiny, usually whitish or pale brown, densely covered with dark brown circular spots. A blurred longitudinal reddish line runs along the midline where the two halves of the mantle meet in life.

However, the basic colors of the shell are very variable, as they range from melanic or chestnut red to albino. The lower margins are rounded and the ventral side is white or whitish, with several long and fine teeth along the aperture.

In live animals the mantle is thin and quite transparent, with many longitudinal slight lines and numerous long and white sensorial papillae. The lateral extensions of the mantle may cover the shell completely, meeting at the midline of the dorsum. The mantle can also be withdrawn into the shell opening when the cowry is threatened.

Distribution
The panther cowry is endemic to the Red Sea (off Egypt and Sudan), Gulf of Aqaba, Dahlak Islands and Gulf of Aden). Its range does not overlap with Cypraea tigris. This species has also become established in the Mediterranean Sea (Lampedusa Island and Malta), probably having entered through the Suez Canal.

Habitat

Subspecies and forms
 Cypraea pantherina pantherina Lightfoot, 1786 
 Cypraea pantherina pantherina form albonitens Melvill, J.C., 1888 
 Cypraea pantherina pantherina form catulus Schilder, F.A., 1924  
 Cypraea pantherina pantherina form funebralis Sulliotti, G.R., 1924 
 Cypraea pantherina pantherina form nigrovinosa  Vayssière, A.J.B.M., 1923 
 Cypraea pantherina rasnasraniensis Heiman & Mienis, 2001

References

 Lorenz F. & Hubert A. - A guide to worldwide cowries. Edition 2. Hackenheim: Conchbooks. 584 pp

External links 
 Atlas of Exotic Molluscs in the Mediterranean
 Biolib

Cypraeidae
Gastropods described in 1786